CBUFT-DT (channel 26) is an Ici Radio-Canada Télé station in Vancouver, British Columbia, Canada, which serves the province's Franco-Columbian population and Franco-Yukonnais in Yukon. It is part of a twinstick with CBC Television station CBUT-DT (channel 2). Both stations share studios at the CBC Regional Broadcast Centre on Hamilton Street in downtown Vancouver, while CBUFT-DT's transmitter is located atop Mount Seymour in the district municipality of North Vancouver.

History
The station first signed on the air on September 27, 1976 on UHF channel 26; as Vancouver's second UHF television station after CKVU (channel 21, now on channel 10); it took Radio-Canada programming from CBUT (channel 2), which had previously aired select programs from the network on weekend mornings since 1964; upon CBUFT's sign-on, CBUT became an exclusive English-language station again.

Technical information

Subchannel

Analogue-to-digital conversion
On August 31, 2011, the official date in which Canadian television stations in CRTC-designated mandatory markets transitioned from analogue to digital broadcasts, CBUFT flash cut its digital signal into operation on UHF channel 26. Following the transition, the station's over-the-air signal coverage area expanded to include parts of the Saanich Peninsula, though reception in Victoria varies depending on the area.

CBUFT's transmits its digital signal in the 720p resolution format. This differs from the majority of terrestrial television stations in Canada that broadcast digital signals, which transmit HD programming in the 1080i format.

Former transmitters
CBUFT formerly operated seven analogue rebroadcast transmitters, which broadcast in some of the larger British Columbia communities such as Kelowna and Kamloops. CBUFT's content was also broadcast on a transmitter in Whitehorse, Yukon, although that transmitter was technically licensed to Montreal sister station CBFT. It also formerly operated rebroadcast transmitters in Chilliwack, Dawson Creek, Kitimat, Lillooet, Logan Lake, Prince George and Terrace.

Due to federal funding reductions to the CBC, in April 2012, the CBC responded with substantial budget cuts, which included shutting down CBC's and Radio-Canada's remaining analogue transmitters on July 31, 2012. None of CBC or Radio-Canada's television rebroadcast transmitters were converted to digital, leaving rural Canadians and U.S. border regions with no free over-the-air Radio-Canada coverage, requiring a subscription to a cable or satellite provider to receive programming from the two networks in those areas.

British Columbia

Yukon

References

External links
 CBUFT-DT ("ICI Colombie-Britannique–Yukon") official website 
 Canadian Communications Foundation - CBUFT-DT History
 

BUFT-DT
BUFT-DT
Television channels and stations established in 1976
1976 establishments in British Columbia